Beate Huitfeldt (Copenhagen, 27 November 1554 – 1626), was a Danish noble and court official. She served as maid of honour to queen of Denmark Sophie of Mecklenburg-Güstrow in 1572–1574, as  Principal lady-in-waiting to queen Anne Catherine of Brandenburg in 1597–1612, and royal governess of the household of the royal princes in 1612–1617. She is known for her activity as a builder in Scania. 

She was the daughter of nobleman Christoffer Huitfeldt (1501–1559) and married Knud Ebbesen Ulfeldt of Svenstorp Castle in Scania (d. 1586). She was granted the Möllerup Castle in Scania for her court service.

References
Dansk biografisk Lexikon / VIII. Bind. Holst - Juul
 M. J. Medelfar, Ligpræd. ov. B. H., 1629. 
Svenstorps slott på Slottsguiden

1554 births
1626 deaths
16th-century Danish people
16th-century Danish nobility
Danish ladies-in-waiting
Governesses to Danish royalty
17th-century Danish landowners
17th-century Danish women landowners
Huitfeldt family
16th-century Danish landowners